This is a list of shopping malls in Iran.

References

Shopping malls
Iran